Heinrich "Heinz" Hitler (14 March 1920 – 21 February 1942) was the son of Alois Hitler Jr. and his second "wife" Hedwig Heidemann (whom he had actually married bigamously). He was the younger half-brother of William Stuart-Houston. He was also a nephew of Adolf Hitler, who reportedly called Heinz his favorite nephew.

Heinz was a strong supporter of the Nazis. He attended an elite boarding school, the National Political Institutes of Education (Napola) at Ballenstedt in Saxony-Anhalt. When World War II began, he joined the Wehrmacht.

Aspiring to be an officer, Heinz became a signals subofficer with the 23rd Potsdamer Artillery Regiment in 1941, and was sent to serve on the Eastern Front, participating in the invasion of the Soviet Union, known as Operation Barbarossa. On 10 January 1942, he was ordered to collect radio equipment from an army post. He was captured by Soviet forces and died at the Butyrka military prison in Moscow in February 1942, at the age of 21. Adolf Hitler approved of an offer to exchange Yakov Dzhugashvili (Stalin's son) through the Swedish Red Cross for Heinz, but Stalin, still enraged that Yakov surrendered, rejected it.

See also
Hitler family

References
Notes

Bibliography

 
 

1920 births
1942 deaths
Heinz
German Army personnel killed in World War II
German prisoners of war in World War II held by the Soviet Union
German torture victims
German people who died in Soviet detention
Recipients of the Iron Cross (1939), 2nd class
German Army soldiers of World War II
Military personnel from Magdeburg